Roddie is a masculine given name, often a short form of Roderick, and a surname. It may refer to:

 Roderick Roddie Edmonds (1919–1985), World War II American master sergeant who protected Jewish-American prisoners of war from their German captors
 Roddie Haley (1964–2022), American sprinter
 Roderick Roddie MacDonald (born 1954), Scottish footballer
 Roderick Roddie MacKenzie (1901–?), Scottish footballer
 Roderick Roddie Munro (1920–1976), Scottish footballer
 Andy Roddie (born 1971), Scottish footballer

See also
 Roddy, a given name and surname

English-language masculine given names
Hypocorisms